This article contains an overview of the year 1994 in athletics.

International events
 Asian Games
 Balkan Games
 Commonwealth Games
 European Championships
 European Indoor Championships
 Jeux de la Francophonie
 Goodwill Games
 World Cross Country Championships
 World Junior Championships

World records

Men

Women

Uta Pippig (GER) equals the world record in the women's Half Marathon held by South Africa's Elana Meyer since 1991-05-18, clocking 1:07:59 on 1994-03-20 in Kyoto, Japan.

Awards

Men

Women

Men's Best Year Performers

100 metres

200 metres

400 metres

800 metres

1,500 metres

Mile

3,000 metres

5,000 metres

10,000 metres

Half Marathon

Marathon

110 m Hurdles

400 m Hurdles

3000 m Steeplechase

High Jump

Long Jump

Triple Jump

Discus

Shot Put

Hammer

Javelin (new design)

Pole Vault

Decathlon

Women's Best Year Performers

60 metres

100 metres

200 metres

400 metres

800 metres

1,500 metres

Mile

3,000 metres

5,000 metres

10,000 metres

Half Marathon

Marathon

60 metres hurdles

100 m Hurdles

400 m Hurdles

High Jump

Long Jump

Triple Jump

Shot Put

Javelin (old design)

Hammer Throw

Heptathlon

Deaths
September 23 – Antanas Mikėnas (70), Soviet-Lithuanian racewalker (b. 1924)

References
 Year Lists
 1994 Year Rankings
 Association of Road Racing Statisticians

 
Athletics (track and field) by year